Jean-Marc Perret (born 10 April 1975) is a British actor, most notable for his appearance as Prince Caspian in the BBC adaptation of Prince Caspian in 1989, when aged 14.

A year later, Perret made a brief appearance in the final few minutes of The Silver Chair. He played a young Caspian in Aslan's country after the elderly King Caspian (played by Geoffrey Russell) in Narnia had died.

For a period, he taught acting and drama at his old school, Bodiam Manor School in East Sussex. He now runs the stage combat company Cut & Thrust. He most recently starred in the West Yorkshire Playhouse and Birmingham Rep co-production of To Kill a Mockingbird.

Jean-Marc can be seen in the  Disney live action Feature film Cinderella.

Filmography

External links
 
 CUT & THRUST Jean-Marc Perret

1975 births
Living people
British male television actors